At the Hub (tr. Ba-'avi ha-shir: Mivhar shirim) is a lengthy 2007 Hebrew political poem written by Uri Zvi Greenberg and edited by Dan Miron and Greenberg's widow .

Reception
Writing for the liberal newspaper Haaretz,  from Hebrew University of Jerusalem's Hebrew literature department called the poem "one of the highest peaks of Hebrew poetry", and compared Greenberg's work to those of Hayim Nahman Bialik, Shmuel Yosef Agnon, Dahlia Ravikovitch, James Joyce, Dr. Nathan Zach, Franz Kafka, Dr. Yitzhak Laor, W. B. Yeats, William Faulkner, Osip Mandelstam, and, Rainer Maria Rilke, "as, his work is equal to theirs," adding that the poem "is a wellspring of rare beauty and wisdom," and is "the most profound confrontation written in Hebrew with man's breakdown during the 20th century, including the dissolution of European Jewry during World War II, which is man's shattered mirror."

Also writing for Haaretz, critic Dr. Oreet Meital opined that Dr. Miron attempted, via the aforementioned footnotes, to depoliticize Greenberg's poem: "Uri Zvi Greenberg's poetry should not lose, upon moving from the fringes to the mainstream, its provocative, violent, and, paradoxical nature, for, its canonization, especially if done so tendentiously and deliberately, is a castrating mechanism working against the text's subversiveness and against the wild dimension which is part of its magic and essence. Hence, one should be wary of this whitewashing rendering Uri Zvi Greenberg anemic."

Writing for the right-leaning magazine , critic Dr.  underscored that "at a time during which talks of a clash of civilizations are common, Uri Zvi Greenberg's ideas seem relevant more and more, however, we still do not completely understand their implications," for, "Uri Zvi Greenberg's poetry is a poetry of heights, a poetry of a deep soul which demands, both from itself and from others, extraordinary demands, and, one cannot be at the presence of this poetry comfortably. This poetry, first and foremost (surprisingly!), is bestowed by a zest for life — not a hedonistic but an ecstatic one — and, it embraces all layers of life: from the mundane to the historical, from the material to the spiritual, from the erotic to the religious. Uri Zvi Greenberg constructs his poetry out of all of life. This is a poetry of complete freedom, in which the poet allows himself (this is the correct expression) to use all registers, all associations, and, all literary forms, in order to express himself," as, "this is a poetry of loneliness."

References

Further reading
אלפרוביץ, ד״ר ליאור. האדישות הקוסמית לסבל ולשכול. בתוך: טיים־אאוט תל אביב, פתח תקווה: סטימצקי, גיליון 250, ב׳ עד ט׳ באלול ה׳תשס״ז/16 עד 23 באוגוסט 2007, עמ׳ 244. 
מן, ד״ר ניר. משורר החזון והכתלים החלקים. בתוך: מקור ראשון, תל אביב–יפו: ישראל היום, כ״ז בתמוז ה׳תשס״ז/13 ביולי 2007. 
פישלוב, פרופ׳ ד״ר דוד. גלות מרצון ומאונס. בתוך: ידיעות אחרונות, ראשון לציון: ידיעות אחרונות, ה׳ באב ה׳תשס״ז/20 ביולי 2007.

External links
גרינברג–טור־מלכא, אורי צבי. בַּעֲבִי הַשִּׁיר: מבחר שירים, ע. עליזה גרינברג–טור־מלכא ופרופ׳ אמריטוס ד״ר דן מירון, עם ״פתח דבר,״ עמ׳ 15–35 מאת פרופ׳ אמריטוס ד״ר דן מירון. ירושלים: מוסד ביאליק, ה׳תשס״ז/2007, מהדורה שנייה: ה׳תשס״ט/2008, 616 עמ׳, 9789653429239. 

2007 non-fiction books
2007 poems
Books about Christianity
Books about diseases
Books about emotions
Books about Europe
Books about Israel
Books about Jews and Judaism
Books about spirituality
Counterculture
Existentialist books
Experimental literature
Expressionist works
Far-right politics in Israel
Hebrew-language books
Historical poems
Books about the Holocaust
Israeli poetry
Jewish literature
Modernist poems
Monarchism
Philosophical poems
Poems about diseases and disorders
Poems about sexuality
Poems about the Holocaust
Poems by Uri Zvi Greenberg
Political books
Political literature
Religious poetry
Works about melancholia
Works about psychology